Dee Street Halt railway station was a short-lived stopping place on the Aberdeen and Ballater railway branch. This section of line was opened in 1859.
 
Following the 1955 Modernisation Plan efforts were made on several parts of the British Railways network to increase passenger traffic by the construction of additional stopping places and the use of diesel multiple-unit trains. Fourteen very simple stops were opened in 1958–61 on lines in Scotland and on the Western Region, as well as slightly more substantial ‘traditional’ halts on the Banbury – Buckingham line in 1956; Rosslynlee Hospital Halt on the Peebles Railway in 1958; and Dee Street in 1961. None produced sufficient additional revenue to prevent closure of the lines concerned.
 
The purpose of the stop was to serve the town of Banchory better than the long-established main station which was some distance from the centre.
 
The structure was exceptionally simple, consisting of a very short wooden platform reached from the street by a long wooden staircase. There was no shelter and only oil lamps were provided. By the time of closure all passenger services on the branch were worked by diesel multiple-unit trains, after an experiment with battery-electric railcars in 1958 – 1962.
 
The halt opened on 6 February 1961, and closed when the Deeside line passenger service was withdrawn from 28 February 1966.

Routes

References

External links
Film of the station and the Deeside line.

Disused railway stations in Aberdeenshire
Railway stations opened by British Rail
Railway stations in Great Britain opened in 1961
Railway stations in Great Britain closed in 1966
Beeching closures in Scotland
1961 establishments in Scotland
1966 disestablishments in Scotland
Banchory